A statue of Mahatma Gandhi was installed in Davis, California, until 2021.

See also
 List of artistic depictions of Mahatma Gandhi

References

Buildings and structures in Davis, California
Monuments and memorials removed during the George Floyd protests
Sculptures of men in California
Statues in California
Davis, California
Statues removed in 2021
Vandalized works of art in California